Mecyclothorax subquadratus is a species of ground beetle in the subfamily Psydrinae. It was described by Perrault in 1984.

References

subquadratus
Beetles described in 1984